Gang of Balhae (died 809) was the sixth king of Balhae, ascending to the throne in 794 and ruling until his death. He was the son of King Mun, who was Balhae's third king. He chose the era name Jeongnyeok (正曆, "upright policy"). During his reign, there was active trade with Japan and Tang China, and missions passed frequently among the three states.

Family
Father: Dae Heummu, King Mun (문왕 대흠무, 文王 大欽茂)
Grandfather: Dae Muye, King Mu (무왕 대무예, 武王 大武藝)
Unnamed wife
Son?: Dae Cheongyun (대청윤, 大淸允)
Son?: Dae Neungsin (대능신, 大能信)
1st son: Dae Wonyu, King Jeong (정왕 대원유, 定王 大元瑜)
2nd son: Dae Eonui, King Hui (희왕 대언의, 僖王 大言義)
3rd son: Dae Myeongchung, King Gan (간왕 대명충, 簡王 大明忠)

See also
List of Korean monarchs
History of Korea

References

809 deaths
Balhae rulers
Mohe peoples
9th-century rulers in Asia
8th-century rulers in Asia
Year of birth unknown